Dave Ellis is an American saxophonist. A native of the San Francisco Bay Area, Ellis came to prominence in the 1990s as a member of guitarist Charlie Hunter's band. Ellis has since been known for his work with Bob Weir after the breakup of the Grateful Dead and with flugelhornist Dmitri Matheny.

Ellis has recorded albums as a bandleader. His State of Mind album (2003), is his second recording produced by Orrin Keepnews and won a 2004 award for Outstanding Album from the California Music Awards.

Dave and his sister, Zoe Ellis, have collaborated as an act called ZADELL.

Discography
 Raven (Monarch, 1996)
 In the Long Run (Monarch, 1998)
 State of Mind (Milestone, 2001 [rel. 2003])

With Black Crowes
Freak 'n' Roll...Into the Fog: The Black Crowes All Join Hands, The Fillmore, San Francisco (Eagle, 2006)
With Charlie Hunter
 Charlie Hunter Trio (Prawn Song, 1993)
 Bing, Bing, Bing! (Blue Note, 1995)
 Ready... Set... Shango! (Blue Note, 1996)
With The Other Ones
 The Strange Remain (Arista, 1999)
With Bob Weir and RatDog
 Evening Moods (Arista, 2000)

References

External links
 

African-American saxophonists
African-American jazz musicians
American people of Jewish descent
American male saxophonists
Musicians from the San Francisco Bay Area
Living people
Year of birth missing (living people)
The Other Ones members
21st-century American saxophonists
Jazz musicians from California
21st-century American male musicians
American male jazz musicians
21st-century African-American musicians
American jazz saxophonists